Jean-Cyril Robin (born 27 August 1969) is a French former professional road racing cyclist.

Major results

1987
 1st  Road race, National Junior Road Championships
 8th Junior road race, UCI World Road Championships
1990
 1st Boucles de la Mayenne
 1st Stage 4 Tour du Limousin
1991
 3rd Overall Tour d'Armorique
 8th Chrono des Herbiers
 8th Trophée des Grimpeurs
1992
 1st Grand Prix de Rennes
 1st Stage 3 Tour d'Armorique
 3rd Cholet-Pays de Loire
 5th Overall Tour Méditerranéen
 6th Overall Tour du Limousin
 6th Trophée des Grimpeurs
 7th Tour de Vendée
1993
 1st  Overall Tour d'Armorique
1st Stage 1
 1st Route Adélie de Vitré
 3rd Classique des Alpes
1994
 4th Overall Circuit Cycliste Sarthe
 9th GP de la Ville de Rennes
1995
 1st Stage 5 Four Days of Dunkirk
 5th Overall Route du Sud
 5th Overall Critérium du Dauphiné Libéré
 5th Trophée des Grimpeurs
 8th Japan Cup Cycle Road Race
 8th Overall Tour de l'Oise
 8th Overall Grand Prix du Midi Libre
1996
 5th Overall Tour DuPont
 9th Overall Giro d'Italia
1997
 3rd Overall Critérium du Dauphiné Libéré
 5th Overall Tour du Limousin
1998
 4th Overall Tour of Galicia
 6th Overall Tour de France
 8th Trophée des Grimpeurs
 9th Overall Volta a Catalunya
 9th Classique des Alpes
 10th Overall Critérium du Dauphiné Libéré
1999
 2nd Overall Tour du Poitou-Charentes
1st Stage 1
 2nd Overall Tour Trans-Canada
1st Stage 4
 2nd Prix des Bles d'Or, Mi-Août en Bretagne
 3rd  Road race, UCI Road World Championships
 4th Giro dell'Emilia
 4th Cholet-Pays de Loire
 5th Road race, National Road Championships
 8th Overall Route du Sud
 10th Milano–Torino
2000
 1st Prix du Léon
 2nd Overall Tour du Limousin
 2nd Tour du Finistère
 6th GP Ouest France-Plouay
 6th Grand Prix d'Isbergues
 10th Paris–Bourges
2001
 2nd Tour du Finistère
 4th Boucles de l'Aulne
 6th Grand Prix d'Isbergues
 7th Paris–Bourges
2002
 6th Classique des Alpes
 8th Overall 4 Jours de Dunkerque
 9th Overall Route du Sud
2003
 6th Boucles de l'Aulne

Grand Tour general classification results timeline

External links 

Palmares by memoire-du-cyclisme.net 

French male cyclists
Living people
1969 births
People from Lannion
Sportspeople from Côtes-d'Armor
Cyclists from Brittany